Jean-Marie Vanlerenberghe (born 29 March 1939 ) is a French politician of the Democratic Movement (MoDem) who has been serving as a member of the Senate since 2001.

Early life and career
Vanlerenberghe was born in Bully-les-Mines, Pas-de-Calais. He is an engineer by training, having studied at the Institut Catholique d'Arts et Métiers in Lille and holding a degree from the Centre des Hautes Études de la Construction. He worked in Arras for the Public Works Commission, also holding jobs from 1964 to 1974 at Rhône-Poulenc and the Centre d'Études Supérieurs Industrielles.

From 1981 to 1986, Vanlerenberghe led the Fédération Nationale du Crédit Mutuel Agricole et Rural in Paris; from 1990 to 1993, he directed the Conseil en Développement d'Entreprises et Ressources Humaines.

Political career

Member of the European Parliament
Vanlerenberghe was a Member of the European Parliament from 1986 to 1989 and again from 1993 to 1994. In parliament, he served on the Committee on Youth, Culture, Education, Information and Sport (1986–1987), the Committee on Budgets (1987–1989) and the Committee on the Environment, Public Health and Consumer Protection (1993–1994).

Mayor of Arras
Vanlerenberghe served as mayor of Arras from June 1995 to February 2011. Having won reelection as mayor in the 2008 elections with broad cross-party support, he left his post in February 2011 in favor of his successor, fellow MoDem politician Frédéric Leturque.

Member of the Senate
Vanlerenberghe was elected UDF senator from the Pas-de-Calais at in the 2001 elections.

A centrist, Vanlerenberghe joined the MoDem of François Bayrou after the 2007 elections and has since been part of the Centrist Union group at the Palais du Luxembourg. In the Senate, he is a member of the Committee on Social Affairs. Since 2014, he has been serving as the Senate’s lead rapporteur on the social security in France.

Current mandates
 Vice-President of Mouvement démocrate
 Senator for Pas-de-Calais
 Member of the Municipal Council of Arras
 Member of the Urban Community of Arras

Former mandates
 Mayor of Arras
 President of the Urban Community of Arras
 Member of the French Parliamentary Delegation for the European Union
 Member of the Parliamentary Office for the Evaluation of Health Policy
 Regional counsellor for Nord-Pas-de-Calais

Political positions
In 2016, Vanlerenberghe publicly endorsed Alain Juppé in the Republicans’ primaries for the 2017 presidential elections.

References

External links
Information on the website of the French Senate

1939 births
Living people
People from Bully-les-Mines
Centre of Social Democrats politicians
Union for French Democracy politicians
Democratic Movement (France) politicians
French Senators of the Fifth Republic
Mayors of places in Hauts-de-France
Union of Democrats and Independents politicians
Senators of Pas-de-Calais
French people of Belgian descent